District - Mandya

"Sangama" is the confluence of 3 holy rivers Kaveri River, Lokapavani River & Hemavati River. It is in Srirangapatna, Mandya.

Rivers of Karnataka
Srirangapatna
Rivers of India

To my knowledgement the third river joining at the confluence 'Sangama' cannot be Hemavathi because, Hemavathi joins Kaveri just before Krishnaraja Sagar dam much before Srirangapattana.The three rivers can only be
1. Lokapaavani
2. Dakshina Kaveri and
3. Uttara Kaveri.

Kaveri splits into two a couple of kilometers before Srirangapattana. Both branches flow almost parallel to each other a few kilometers apart and rejoin at the Sangama. Just before this, Lokapaavani joins the Uttara Kaveri branch near the Nimishamba temple.

The above edit just now added is by Sirimane Nagaraj, a journalist and social activist based in Bengaluru, Karnataka.